The Nokia 3310 is a discontinued GSM mobile phone announced on 1 September 2000, and released in the fourth quarter of the year, replacing the popular Nokia 3210. It sold very well, being one of the most successful phones, with 126 million units sold worldwide, and being one of Nokia's most iconic devices. The phone is still widely acclaimed and has gained a cult status due to its reputation for durability.

Several variants of the 3310 have been released, including the Nokia 3315, 3320, 3330, 3350, 3360, 3390 and 3395.

The Nokia 3310 was produced at factories in Finland and Hungary. The 3315s were produced in South Korea for the Asia-Pacific market.

A new mobile phone based on the 3310 design was launched in 2017. The new Nokia 3310 model comes with a comprehensive update over its predecessor, with a 2.4" color display, a 2 Megapixel rear camera and a microSD slot.

Design

The 3310 was developed at the Copenhagen Nokia site in Denmark and unveiled at the "Don't be bored. Be totally board." lifestyle event in Oberhausen, Germany, as well as "Nokia Unplugged" concerts in the Asia-Pacific region. It is a compact and sturdy phone featuring an 84 × 48 pixel pure monochrome display. It has a lighter removable  battery variant which has fewer features; for example the 133 g (4.6 oz) battery version has the start-up image of two hands touching while the 115 g (4.05 oz) version does not. It is a slightly rounded rectangular unit that is typically held in the palm of a hand, with the buttons operated with the thumb. The blue button is the main button for selecting options, with "C" button as a "backspace", "back" or "undo" button. Up and down buttons are used for navigation purposes. The on/off/profile button is a stiff black button located on the top of the phone. Like its predecessor Nokia 3210, the 3310 was marketed as a customizable consumer-oriented handset targeting the youth. It is about a centimeter shorter than the 3210.

The 3310 is known for being reasonably durable due to its casing and construction, a feature which is often humorously exaggerated in online communities. Numerous videos also exist of the phone being put through increasingly-severe damage tests to test the phone's strength, including being dropped from a great height (sometimes while being protected with makeshift cases made from various objects), being crushed by heavy objects or being struck by vehicles or hammers, many times of which the phone proved its record. The 3310's reputation for durability led HMD Global to develop the Nokia 800 Tough with MIL-STD-810G standard compliance in mind.

Features
The Nokia 3310's main new feature introduced over its predecessors was a Chat function. This is an instant messaging-like feature that works on standard SMS. The 3310 was popular for SMS text messaging because of Chat and also because it allowed long messages three times the size of a standard SMS text message, at 459 characters. It also featured threaded SMS writing and voice dialing for the quick dialing of selected numbers.

The 3310 is known for having many features that were rare for the time. These include many utilities, such as a calculator, Nokia network monitor, stop watch and a reminder function. It has four games: Pairs II, Space Impact, Bantumi, and the hugely popular Snake II. The Snake series of games had been popular on Nokia handsets since the late 1990s. CNET remembered Space Impact, a shoot 'em up in which the player fires projectiles at oncoming aliens, as a mediocre game overall but impressive for fitting a mobile device with its complexity and length. It was later recreated for other mobile devices.

The Nokia 3310 runs on Nokia's proprietary Series 20 software.

The Nokia 3310 uses a MiniSIM (more commonly known as a standard SIM).

Customization
The Nokia 3310 can be customized with interchangeable Xpress-On covers, and thousands of different designs have been produced by various companies. It also has over 35 ringtones built-in with space for seven custom tones. These can either be downloaded, or composed by the user on the handset. The phone has various "profiles" that can set a number of preferences such as silent mode where the phone will not ring, useful for situations where it is inappropriate to do so. Screensavers can be made from received picture messages.

Variants

3315, 3390 and 3395
An enhanced version of the 3310 is the Nokia 3315, which has some additional features:
 A picture editor to edit pictures for use in SMS Picture messaging and screensavers on the phone
 Timed profiles
 Could use received ringtones as SMS tones
 Fixed some of the bugs found in the 3310
 Automatic keypad locking after specified time
 The right button, which finish the call, activates the key guard at the same time. So keyguard may be "off" in settings, but it will be activated anyway every time you finish the call. To make a call, you always have to disable keyguard first (even if it says "off" in the settings menu)
 Accidental emergency calls are not possible because keyguard is always "on"
 Peanut-like interconnected silicon key mat
 3315s sold in Singapore and Malaysia had a blue backlight for the LCD screen and keypad, as opposed to green in other markets
 Similar design to its successor, the Nokia 3410
The 3315 was also released in Australia. Most versions of the 3310 could be upgraded to include the additional features of the 3315 by using a data cable.

There are two North American variants of the 3310; one is the Nokia 3390, which operates on GSM 1900. The Nokia 3395 is an updated version of the 3390, which includes the additional features of the Asian 3315 model, and it has poor reception if connected to a GSM 850 area.

WAP-enhanced models (3330 and 3350)

The Nokia 3330 added a CSD-based WAP capability, animated Screensavers, a pinball game named Bumper, and phonebook (stored in the phone memory as opposed to the SIM card in earlier models) with a 100-entry capacity to the model. It also has the capability of downloading Java MIDP apps via WAP (such as Snake II mazes, Bumper tables, and Space Impact chapters).

An Asia-Pacific only version, known as the Nokia 3350, was in essence an improved 3330 with WAP, rhythmic backlight alert, animated Screensavers, two-way Navi-Key, dedicated call and hang buttons, Chinese lunar calendar, and a 96-by-65-pixel screen. Some 3350s have back covers that feature a photo-insert window, allowing users to put personal pictures from photographs, magazine cut-outs, etc.

AMPS/D-AMPS-based versions (3320 and 3360)
The Nokia 3360 and 3320 are related models designed for the U.S. and Canadian markets, respectively. They are externally similar to the 3310 and 3390, but they use Digital AMPS ("TDMA")/AMPS technology rather than GSM.

Like the Asian 3350, they include two dedicated call and hang buttons and two soft keys. They also feature an infrared port. Unlike the 3390, the 3360 and 3320 do not support voice dialing. At 136 grams each, they are also slightly heavier than the 3390, which weighs 119 grams.

Legacy
The Nokia 3310 has a reputation of great durability, and many Internet memes have been made calling the phone "indestructible" or "the Nokia Brick" and praising its durability compared to modern smartphones. In a retrospective piece, TechRepublic called the Nokia 3310 "a big tough cockroach of a phone" and praised its "legendary durability".

In November 2015, the Nokia 3310 was chosen as one of the first three "National Emojis" for Finland. The emoji is referred to as "The Unbreakable", as the phone was known for its aforementioned toughness and durability.

Revival

On 14 February 2017, it was reported that a revived version of the 3310 would be unveiled at the 2017 Mobile World Congress in Barcelona by HMD Global Oy, the Finnish manufacturer with rights to market phones under the Nokia brand, forecasting a price point of €49. On 26 February 2017, the modernized version of the 3310 was launched at a price of €49.

References and footnotes

External links

 
 
 
 
 

3310
Mobile phones introduced in 2000
Internet memes
Mobile phones with user-replaceable battery